Sympistis piffardi, the three-striped oncocnemis, is a species of moth in the family Noctuidae (the owlet moths). It is found in North America.

The MONA or Hodges number for Sympistis piffardi is 10123.

References

Further reading

 
 
 

piffardi
Articles created by Qbugbot
Moths described in 1862